Twin Beds is a lost 1920 American silent film comedy directed by Lloyd Ingraham and starring Carter DeHaven and Flora Parker DeHaven. It was based on a 1914 Broadway play Twin Beds by Salisbury Field and Margaret Mayo. Carter DeHaven produced the film, and it was released by First National Pictures.

Cast
Carter DeHaven as Signor Monti
Flora Parker DeHaven as Blanche Hawkins
Helen Raymond as Signora Monti
William Desmond as Harry Hawkins
Katherine Lewis as Amanda Tate
William Irving as Andrew Larkin
Lottie Williams as Nora
Jack Carlyle (Undetermined Role) (credited as J. Montgomery Carlyle)

References

External links 
 

Stills at silentfilmstillarchive.com

1920 films
Lost American films
American silent feature films
Films directed by Lloyd Ingraham
American films based on plays
American black-and-white films
Silent American comedy films
1920 comedy films
1920 lost films
Lost comedy films
1920s American films